The Catholic Campaign for America (CCA) was an Roman Catholic activist organization founded in 1989 by Thomas Vincent Wykes Jr. (born 1962), "who wanted to address the moral crisis in America with a Catholic response." 

In 1991, Wykes gathered together several notable Catholic leaders in Washington, D.C., who constituted the CCA's first Board. They included William Bennett, Mary Ellen Bork, Bishop René Henry Gracida, and the now-deceased Hugh Carey (former Governor of New York). According to the National Catholic Register, the CCA was initiated to "bring a politically powerful and distinctively Catholic voice to the U.S. political scene".

Wykes is also the founding president of Springtime of Faith Foundation, which is headquartered in Nashville, Tennessee.

Motto
"The Gospel of Jesus Christ is not a private opinion, a remote spiritual ideal, or a mere program for spiritual growth. The Gospel is the power to transform the world."

External links
Catholic Herald
 ZENIT 
 Roman Catholic Diocese of Nashville website

Roman Catholic activists
Catholic Church in the United States